Johan Pettersson (born 28 June 1980]) is a Swedish former professional footballer who played as a forward for IF Vindhemspojkarna, IK Sirius and IF Brommapojkarna.

References

External links
 
 

Living people
1980 births
Footballers from Uppsala
Association football forwards
Swedish footballers
Allsvenskan players
Superettan players
IK Sirius Fotboll players
IF Brommapojkarna players
Örebro SK players
Degerfors IF players